Bolton High School is the name of several schools:
Bolton High School (Connecticut) in Bolton, Connecticut
Bolton High School (Louisiana) in Alexandria, Louisiana
Bolton High School (Tennessee) in Arlington, Tennessee